Echo School may refer to:
Echo School (Oregon), a public primary and secondary school in Echo, Oregon
Echo School (Echo, Utah), a historic two-room schoolhouse that was built in 1914 in Echo, Utah
Echo Church and School, a church and school building  in Echo, Utah, that includes work from 1876 in Late Gothic Revival architecture